Markham-Albertson-Stinson Cottage, also known as Stinson's Ranch, was a historic home located at Nags Head, Dare County, North Carolina.  It was built about 1916, and was a -story, frame, Outer Banks cottage on pilings above the water.  It had a wide porch on three sides. It was destroyed by Hurricane Irene in 2011.

It was listed on the National Register of Historic Places in 2006.

References

Houses on the National Register of Historic Places in North Carolina
Houses completed in 1916
Houses in Dare County, North Carolina
National Register of Historic Places in Dare County, North Carolina